Lamahi Municipality is a municipality (rural township) in Dang District of Lumbini Province, Nepal.  It was created in 2015 as part of the conversion from the old zone/village development committee structure to the province/municipality structure. In 2011 (2068 VS) the municipality had a population of 47,655 with 9,432 households.

Lamahi Municipality combined the VDCs of Sonpur and Chailahi.

Notes and references

Populated places in Dang District, Nepal